Heroes & Gods is the seventh studio album by American singer Rahsaan Patterson. It was released by Shanachie Records on May 17, 2019. Patterson's debut with the label as well as his first album in eight years, Heroes & Gods debuted and peaked at number 29 on the US Independent Albums chart.

Critical reception

AllMusic editor Andy Kellman wrote that "like his two most recent albums, Bleuphoria and Wines & Spirits, it communicates many emotions relating to intimacy and continually switches up sounds, like a lovingly personalized 60-minute mixtape that prioritizes quality over flow [...] Patterson references bygone eras crossing several decades while twisting contemporary sounds, grounded as ever in gospel and soul, and throws in a couple of stylistic curveballs. The idiosyncratic set is out of time and modern at once."

Track listing

Charts

Release history

References

2019 albums
Rahsaan Patterson albums